La Marolle-en-Sologne (literally La Marolle in Sologne), commonly known as La Marolle, is a town and commune in the Loir-et-Cher department in the administrative region of Centre-Val de Loire, France.

The town is located in the natural region of Sologne.

Population

See also
Communes of the Loir-et-Cher department

References

Communes of Loir-et-Cher